Archidemis anastea is a species of moth of the family Tortricidae. It is found in Mindanao in the Philippines.

References

Archipini
Endemic fauna of the Philippines
Moths described in 1968
Moths of Asia
Taxa named by Alexey Diakonoff